The NCAA Sportsmanship Award is given to men and women in National Collegiate Athletics Association sports who have demonstrated one or more of the ideals of sportsmanship, including fairness, civility, honesty, respect and responsibility.  It was created and first awarded in 1999.

List of recipients
 1999: Allison Beighton, Randolph-Macon College, basketball; and Jarrett Erwin, Rice University, football
 2000: George Audu, Pennsylvania State College, track and field; Safiya Ingram, University of Alabama Tuscaloosa, track and field; and Lindsay Morton, Ferrum College, tennis
 2001:
 2002:
 2003: 
 2004: Chanda Gunn, Northeastern University, ice hockey; Danny Gathings, High Point University, basketball; and the football team at Mesa State College
 2005: Philip B. Barr, Bates College, swimming; and Lauren Clary, Xavier University, tennis
 2006: Mike Rose, Slippery Rock University, decathlon; and Sarah Dawn Schettle, University of Wisconsin–Oshkosh, track and field and swimming
 2007: Brian Hung, University of Michigan, tennis; and the women's soccer team at Framingham State College
 2008: Mallory Holtman, Central Washington University, softball; Einar Often, University of Alaska Fairbanks, Nordic skiing; and the men's baseball team at St. John Fisher College
 2009: Aleksandra "Ola" Mackiewicz, Brown University, Fencing; Isaac Rothenbaum, Carthage College, Swimming; Anthony DiCarlo, Anderson University, Wrestling
 2010:
 2011: Courtney Berger, Nova Southeastern University, Rowing
 2012:
 2013: 
 2014: Jaylee Brown, Northern Michigan University, cross country/track and field; Chari Hawkins, Utah State University, track and field; and the football team at Harding University
 2015: Julius Ryan Bautista "D' Mamangan" Guagua National colleges, Fencing; Isaac Rothenbaum, Carthage College, Swimming; Anthony DiCarlo, Anderson University, Wrestling
 2016: 
 2017:

See also
Today's Top 10 Award (NCAA) (outstanding senior student-athletes)
NCAA Woman of the Year Award (senior female student-athlete)
Walter Byers Scholarship (NCAA) (top male and female scholar-athletes)
Silver Anniversary Awards (NCAA) (former student-athletes)
Lowe's Senior CLASS Award
Best Female College Athlete ESPY Award
Best Male College Athlete ESPY Award
Athlete of the Year

References

Sportsmanship Award
College sports trophies and awards in the United States
Student awards
Awards established in 1999
Sportsmanship trophies and awards
1999 establishments in the United States